Dennis Dorian Politic (born 5 March 2000) is a Romanian professional footballer who plays as a winger for  club Port Vale, on loan from  club Cremonese.  

Politic joined the academy of Manchester United from hometown side Brașov at age 12. He then moved to Bolton Wanderers, with which he recorded his professional debut in 2018 after a loan stint at Salford City. He also had a loan spell at Port Vale, before transferring to Italian club Cremonese in 2022. He returned on loan to Port Vale for the 2022–23 season.

Internationally, Politic earned caps for Romania at under-17 level.

Club career

Early career
Born in Brașov, Politic began his career with CSM Codlea and FC Brașov before joining Manchester United in August 2012, aged 12.

Bolton Wanderers
Politic joined Bolton Wanderers at the age of 15, where he scored hat-tricks in consecutive games for the under-19s in September and October 2017. He signed his first professional contract with the club in summer 2018, and on 26 October that year he was loaned to Salford City of the National League until the new year. He made his senior debut the next day in a 1–1 draw with Ebbsfleet United at Moor Lane, as a 69th-minute substitute for Tom Walker, earning praise from manager Graham Alexander for his impact. He scored his first goal on 1 December as an early substitute in a 3–0 home win against Havant & Waterlooville. He totalled 13 appearances for the Ammies and scored once more on 16 February 2019, opening a 3–1 home loss to Dover Athletic. The long-range strike was likened to one scored by Salford co-owner David Beckham in 1996; Beckham was in attendance at the match. A shoulder injury caused him to miss out on Salford's successful promotion push that took them into the English Football League at the end of the 2018–19 season.

On 3 August 2019, Politic made his Bolton debut by playing the full 90 minutes in their opening game of the League One season, a 2–0 loss at Wycombe Wanderers; the Trotters team had an unfamiliar line-up due to a financial crisis. Ten days later he scored his first goal for the club, in a 5–2 loss at Rochdale in the first round of the EFL Cup. On 1 January 2020, he came on in the 76th-minute for Joe Dodoo and eight minutes later scored his first league goal in a 4–3 loss to Burton Albion at the University of Bolton Stadium. Later that month he signed a contract extension to keep him at Bolton until 2022, after which manager Keith Hill praised him for continuing to work hard. On 11 August 2020, in a 6–0 pre-season victory against Loughborough University, Politic damaged his anterior cruciate ligament following a slip on the pitch and was ruled out for the whole of the 2020–21 season after undergoing a "pretty straightforward operation". He returned to training in April 2021, though manager Ian Evatt decided against playing him in the final few matches of the season, stating it was too risky to do so and would instead wait until the 2021–22 season.

On 16 August 2021, Politic joined League Two club Port Vale on loan for the 2021–22 season, to allow him to regain his prior fitness and develop as a player having missed the entire previous season through injury. Bolton had the option to recall him in January and also offered him a new contract though he did not sign it. Port Vale manager Darrell Clarke said that he had wanted an aggressive ball-carrying wide player and "he fits the criteria massively" despite being right-footed as that "in an ideal world I’d have gotten a left-footed one" He remained a unused substitute in the early stages of the season as Clarke used a 3–5–2 formation, but he did score a brace in a friendly game. He finally made his competitive debut for the "Valiants" on 2 October, coming on against Leyton Orient as a substitute with three minutes remaining, during which he scored the equalising goal as his team went on to win the game 3–2. On 4 December, he scored his first career FA Cup goals; after coming on as a substitute in the 74th minute for David Amoo, Politic scored the equaliser and winner to secure a 2–1 victory over Burton Albion. Bolton manager Ian Evatt stated later that week that he would not be recalling Politic in January as he had not played enough for Port Vale to justify bringing him back, feeling that if he failed to get into a League Two team regularly, he should not get into a League One team either. He was recalled from his loan spell on 17 January, however, amidst reports that a permanent transfer had been arranged with Bolton confirming they had accepted a transfer bid for him.

Cremonese
On 21 January 2022, Politic signed for Serie B side Cremonese on an 18-month contract for an undisclosed fee plus a sell-on clause; the fee was reported by The Bolton News to be £50,000. He made his debut on 22 February as a late substitute in a 0–0 draw with Vicenza at the Stadio Giovanni Zini. Manager Fabio Pecchia led the "Tigers" to promotion into Serie A at the end of the 2021–22 season, though Politic made just three substitute appearances.

On 1 September 2022, he rejoined Port Vale on a season-long loan, with the club now playing in League One. He thanked manager Darrell Clarke for saving a winner's medal from the League Two play-off final for him, saying "I think from the top, all the way down, this is a special club and I think it’s run very well, the people are unbelievable – great characters in this club". He scored his first career hat-trick on 20 September, helping the Vale to a 4–0 victory at Shrewsbury Town in the EFL Trophy. He scored another goal in the FA Cup defeat to Exeter City  on 5 November, in what was his first start in three weeks.

International career
In October 2016, Politic was capped three times for the Romania U17s in qualification games for the 2017 UEFA European Under-17 Championship, in defeats to Austria, England and Azerbaijan at Stadionul CNAF; he missed a penalty against England.

Style of play
Politic is a technically-gifted midfielder with an excellent first touch and ability to score long-range goals. Bolton manager Phil Parkinson described him as a "creative maverick".

Career statistics

References

2000 births
Living people
Sportspeople from Brașov
Romanian footballers
Romanian expatriate footballers
Romania youth international footballers
Association football midfielders
FC Brașov (1936) players
Manchester United F.C. players
Bolton Wanderers F.C. players
Salford City F.C. players
Port Vale F.C. players
U.S. Cremonese players
English Football League players
Serie B players
Romanian expatriate sportspeople in England
Expatriate footballers in England
Romanian expatriate sportspeople in Italy
Expatriate footballers in Italy